Nicole Provis and Elna Reinach were the defending champions, but both players chose to compete at Geneva during the same week, with different partners.

Lori McNeil and Stephanie Rehe won the title by defeating Manon Bollegraf and Mercedes Paz 6–7(2–7), 6–4, 6–4 in the final.

Seeds

Draw

Draw

References

External links
 Official results archive (ITF)
 Official results archive (WTA)

Internationaux de Strasbourg - Doubles
1991 Doubles
Internationaux de Strasbourg